Alexander McGuire (born 5 October 1932) is a New Zealand cricketer. He played in four first-class matches for Central Districts in 1957/58.

See also
 List of Central Districts representative cricketers

References

External links
 

1932 births
Living people
New Zealand cricketers
Central Districts cricketers
Cricketers from Wellington City